John McGrane (born October 12, 1952) is a Scottish-Canadian former soccer player who played as a defender.

Starting his career at Hamilton City, he went on to spend nine years playing in the North American Soccer League for the Los Angeles Aztecs, the Montreal Manic, the Chicago Sting, and the Minnesota Strikers. He retired from playing in 1985.

McGrane competed at the 1976 Summer Olympics and won 12 caps with the Canada national team.

Early life 
McGrane was born in Scotland and moved to Hamilton, Ontario aged 12.

Club career
McGrane began playing semi-professional soccer aged 16. In 1974, he moved to British Columbia to study at Simon Fraser University and was named NAIA MVP in his freshman season. The following year, he was named a NAIC First Team All-American.

He began his professional career with National Soccer League club Hamilton City in 1975 and joined North American Soccer League side the Los Angeles Aztecs in 1977. He was named Rookie of the Year in his first campaign, and played six games for the club during the 1979–80 indoor season.

In 1981, McGrane joined the Montreal Manic and spent his first season playing indoor soccer. He later spent two years with the club competing in outdoor seasons. In 1983, he joined North American Soccer League team the Chicago Sting for the indoor season and moved to the Minnesota Strikers a year later. He played outdoor and indoor seasons for the club before retiring in 1985.

International career
After being spotted playing at Simon Fraser University, McGrane represented Canada at the 1976 Summer Olympics in Montreal. He started both games as a forward as Canada finished bottom of Group G.

In October 1977, McGrane made his debut for the Canada national team as they suffered a 2–1 defeat to El Salvador in 1978 World Cup qualification. He made a further 11 international appearances for Canada, with his final coming in a 1–1 draw with Haiti in November 1981.

Management career
In 1990, McGrane was named as coach of Canadian Soccer League expansion club Kitchener Spirit for their inaugural season, and set up a private coaching company alongside his assistant coach, John Gibson. The following year, he was named as head coach and general manager of league rivals the Hamilton Steelers, with Gibson following as his assistant.

Personal life 
McGrane was born in Scotland and moved to Hamilton, Ontario aged 12. He has four children.

In April 2008, McGrane was inducted into the Canada Soccer Hall of Fame for his services to the Canadian national team and support of Canadian soccer after retiring.

References

External links
 / Canada Soccer Hall of Fame
 
 Soccer World Systems - company background
 
 John McGrane NASL/MISL stats at nasljerseys.com

1952 births
Living people
Canadian expatriate sportspeople in the United States
Canadian expatriate soccer players
Canada men's international soccer players
Canadian National Soccer League players
Canadian soccer coaches
Canada Soccer Hall of Fame inductees
Canadian soccer players
Olympic soccer players of Canada
Footballers at the 1976 Summer Olympics
Chicago Sting (NASL) players
Expatriate soccer players in the United States
Association football defenders
Association football wingers
Los Angeles Aztecs players
Major Indoor Soccer League (1978–1992) players
Montreal Manic players
Minnesota Strikers (NASL) players
Forge FC non-playing staff
North American Soccer League (1968–1984) indoor players
Naturalized citizens of Canada
North American Soccer League (1968–1984) players
Soccer players from Hamilton, Ontario
Scottish emigrants to Canada
Simon Fraser Clan men's soccer players
Footballers from Glasgow
Minnesota Strikers (MISL) players